Franz Kafka (1883–1924) was a German-language writer from Prague.

Kafka may also refer to:
 Kafka (surname)
 Kafka (film), a 1991 film by Steven Soderbergh
 Franz Kafka Prize, also referred as Kafka Prize
 Franz Kafka Society, a non-profit organisation established in 1990 to celebrate the heritage of German Language literature in Prague
 3412 Kafka, an asteroid
 Apache Kafka, an open source Apache Software Foundation project that variously supports message brokering and data storage
 Anti-fascist research group Kafka, a Dutch anti-fascist and far-left research group
 Kafka, a character in Amphetamine
 Kafka Tamura, main character in Kafka on the Shore by Haruki Murakami
 Kafka Hibino, main character in the manga Kaiju No. 8 by Naoya Matsumoto
 Kafka: Toward a Minor Literature, a 1975 book by Gilles Deleuze and Felix Guattari

See also
 Margit Kaffka (1880–1918), Hungarian writer
 Kavka, a surname